Branchinella apophysata is a species of crustacean in the family Thamnocephalidae. It is endemic to Australia, where it is known only from its type locality, a shallow pool on Mount Margaret, near Laverton, Western Australia. It is most closely related to other Australian species, including B. affinis, B. denticulata, B. latzi, B. longirostris and B. probiscida.

References

Branchiopoda
Freshwater crustaceans of Australia
Vulnerable fauna of Australia
Crustaceans described in 1941
Taxonomy articles created by Polbot